PADO may refer to:

 "PPPoE Active Discovery Offer", part of the Point-to-Point Protocol over Ethernet
 Page Down button on computer keyboard
 Peace and Development Organization, an NGO in Pakistan